The fourth season of the family sitcom Full House originally aired on ABC from September 21, 1990 to May 3, 1991. The entire season was directed by Joel Zwick.

Plot
Starting in season four, Danny realizes that he must start disciplining Michelle. Jesse proposes to Becky and they soon become married. Joey's career takes a turn for the better when he is offered a job in Las Vegas to open for Wayne Newton. In the season finale, Becky finds out that she is pregnant as Jesse tells her he wants to go on tour with his band. D. J. begins eighth grade and Stephanie goes to third grade.

Main cast 

 John Stamos as Jesse Katsopolis
 Bob Saget as Danny Tanner 
 Dave Coulier as Joey Gladstone
 Candace Cameron as D. J. Tanner
 Jodie Sweetin as Stephanie Tanner
 Mary-Kate and Ashley Olsen as Michelle Tanner
 Lori Loughlin as Rebecca "Becky" Donaldson

Episodes

See also 
 List of Full House episodes

References 

General references 
 
 

1990 American television seasons
1991 American television seasons
4